Belmont, WA may refer to:

Belmont, Washington, a community in the United States
Belmont, Western Australia, a suburb of Perth in Australia